Conquering the Throne is the debut album by Hate Eternal. It was released on November 2 1999 on Wicked World Records, a subdivision of Earache Records. 

The album cover is from the right portion (Hell) of Hans Memling's painting The Last Judgment. Drummer Tim Yeung made his recording debut on this album.

Track listing
Al songs written by Erik Rutan, except for where noted.
  "Praise of the Almighty"   – 2:38
  "Dogma Condemned"  – 3:00 
  "Catacombs"  – 3:16
  "Nailed to Obscurity" (Doug Cerrito) – 2:22 
  "By His Own Decree"  – 3:25
  "The Creed of Chaotic Divinity"  – 2:58 
  "Dethroned" (Cerrito) – 2:36 
  "Sacrilege of Hate"  – 2:22 
  "Spiritual Holocaust" (Cerrito) – 3:27
  "Darkness by Oath"  – 4:11 
  "Saturated in Dejection"  – 3:08

Credits
 Erik Rutan - lead guitar, lead vocals
 Jared Anderson - bass, backing vocals
 Tim Yeung - drums
 Doug Cerrito - rhythm guitar

References

1999 debut albums
Hate Eternal albums
Albums produced by Erik Rutan
Earache Records albums